The 2014–15 ISU World Standings and Season's World Ranking, are the World Standings and Season's World Ranking published by the International Skating Union (ISU) during the 2014–15 season.  The 2014–15 ISU Season's World Ranking is based on the results of the 2014–15 season only.

The remainder of this section is a complete list, by discipline, published by the ISU.

World Standings for ice dance

Season-end standings 
The remainder of this section is a complete list, by discipline, published by the ISU.

Ice dance (146 couples)

Men's singles (136 skaters)

Ladies' singles (139 skaters)

Pairs (65 couples)

Ice dance (101 couples)

World standings for synchronized skating 

Senior Synchronized (41 Teams)

Junior Synchronized (61 Teams)

See also 
 ISU World Standings and Season's World Ranking
 List of highest ranked figure skaters by nation
 List of ISU World Standings and Season's World Ranking statistics
 2014–15 figure skating season
 2014–15 synchronized skating season

References

External links 
 International Skating Union
 ISU World standings for Single & Pair Skating and Ice Dance / ISU Season's World Ranking
 ISU World standings for Synchronized Skating

ISU World Standings and Season's World Ranking
Standings and Ranking
Standings and Ranking